Església de Sant Climent de Pal  is a church located in Pal, La Massana Parish, Andorra. It is a heritage property registered in the Cultural Heritage of Andorra. It was built in the 11th or 12th century and then again in the 17th or 18th century.

References

La Massana
Roman Catholic churches in Andorra
Cultural Heritage of Andorra